"Sing Happy" is a single by Canadian country music artist Dianne Leigh. The song was released as a single in 1972. It peaked at number 1 on the RPM Country Tracks chart on July 1, 1972.

Chart performance

References

1972 singles
Dianne Leigh songs